WTAM-LD, virtual channel 30 (UHF digital channel 35), is a low-powered Estrella TV owned-and-operated television station licensed to Tampa, Florida, United States and also serving St. Petersburg. The station is owned by HC2 Holdings. The station's transmitter is located in Riverview.

History
The station signed on in August 2005 as TV Informa 30, affiliated with the Mexican Multimedios network, but closed down in February 2006, after failing to find any cable system that would offer the channel in their line-up. Being a low-powered station with no connections with any local full-powered outlets, WTAM was exempt from the Federal Must-carry rules that full-powered stations enjoyed, meaning that cable and satellite companies weren't obligated to offer the channel. Apparently not having the funds or the patience, Lotus opted to shut down WTAM, instead of keeping the station on the air as a terrestrial-only offering.

As of November 2006, WTAM has returned to the air under Rios as a family-oriented channel, TV Visión, still affiliated with Multimedios and also including programming from La Familia Network, brokered by Lotus to TV Vision Network, LLC, a broadcaster founded and owned by Francisco Rios, a founder of the Brandon Christian group, CPR Ministries. WTAM also carried some bilingual, locally produced programs, such as Project 1805 (a weekly music video countdown), El Mundo de Luisitin (a children's program) and Total Action (featuring local sports). It was unknown how long TV Visión's contract with Lotus lasted.

In June 2010, the station began broadcasting a digital signal on channel 28, with virtual channels 30.1-30.4. Subchannels featured included My Family TV on 30.1, and Legacy TV.

In April 2013, WTAM-LD officially launched CNN Latino Tampa, under the operations of SIMA Communications, LLC by its new owner TMA-TIG. However, in February 2014, it was announced that CNN Latino would cease operations by the end of that month, forcing its affiliates, including WTAM-LD, to find alternate programming to fill their slots.

Digital channels
The station's digital signal is multiplexed:

References

External links

TAM-LD
Innovate Corp.
Low-power television stations in the United States
Television channels and stations established in 2005
Lotus Communications stations